María de las Nieves Asensio Liñán known as Neus Asensi (born 4 August 1965, in Barcelona) is a Spanish actress.

She had a very complete training to become an actress. She studied classic dance for 5 years and jazz-dance. She studied drama in the centre  "La Casona" and one speech therapy course.
She has a feature role in the Spanish TV comedy Los hombres de Paco.

Filmography 
 Torrente 5: Operación Eurovegas (2014) by Santiago Segura.
 Tú eliges (2008) by Antonia San Juan.
 Cuerpo a la carta (2007)
 Freedomless (Xoel Pamos & Mike Jacoby, 2007)
 Locos por el sexo (Javier Rebollo, 2006)
 El oro de Moscú (Jesús Bonilla, 2003)
 Tempus fugit (Enric Folch, 2003)
 Esta noche no (Álvaro Sáenz de Heredia, 2002)
 Marujas Asesinas (Javier Rebollo, 2001)
 El paraíso ya no es lo que era (Francesc Betriu, 2001)
 Torrente 2: Misión en Marbella (Santiago Segura, 2001)
 Arachnid (film) (Jack Sholder, 2000)
 El corazón del guerrero (Daniel Monzón, 1999)
 La niña de tus ojos (Fernando Trueba, 1998)
 Torrente: El brazo tonto de la ley (Santiago Segura, 1997)
 Supernova'' (Juan Miñón, 1993)

External links 
 

1965 births
Living people
Actresses from Catalonia
20th-century Spanish actresses
21st-century Spanish actresses
Spanish film actresses